Mississippi Palisades State Park is a National Natural Landmark located in Carroll County, Illinois, just north of the town of Savanna. It is a partially conserved section of the Mississippi Palisades. The area contains many caves and large cliffs along the Mississippi River at the mouth of the Apple River in the Driftless Area of far northwestern Illinois.

In popular culture
Indie music artist Sufjan Stevens made reference to the Palisades in his song "The Predatory Wasp of the Palisades Is Out to Get Us!" on his 2005 concept album Illinois.

See also
 List of National Natural Landmarks in Illinois

Gallery

References

External links 

 
 Mississippi Palisades State Park at USNPS
A Guide to Hiking Mississippi Palisades State Park

1973 establishments in Illinois
National Natural Landmarks in Illinois
Protected areas established in 1973
Protected areas of Carroll County, Illinois
Protected areas on the Mississippi River
State parks of Illinois